L'infermiera nella corsia dei militari, internationally released as The Nurse in the Military Madhouse, is a 1979 commedia sexy all'italiana directed by Mariano Laurenti.

Plot
Grazia Mancini (Nadia Cassini) is an aspiring night club singer. Her boss Eva (Karin Schubert) has a lover, John (Elio Zamuto) who is a trafficker of stolen artworks. The two learn of valuable paintings hidden in a military mental asylum managed by mentally unstable Professor Amedeo Larussa (Lino Banfi). They blackmail Grazia and send her to the mental asylum in the guise of a substitute nurse to learn the whereabouts of the paintings.

Cast 
 Nadia Cassini as Grazia Mancini
 Lino Banfi as Professor Amedeo Larussa 
 Alvaro Vitali as Peppino de Tappis
 Karin Schubert as Eva
 Susan Scott as Veronica Larussa
 Lucio Montanaro as Michele
 Renato Cortesi as Ugolini (who believes himself to be Erwin Rommel)
 Carlo Sposito as Michele (who believes himself to be Moshe Dayan)
 Gino Pagnani as Ottavio
 Ermelinda De Felice as Sister Fulgenzia
 Enzo Andronico as  Cav. Galeazzo Gedeoni 
 Luigi Uzzo as Gustavo
 Elio Zamuto as John, Eva's lover
 Carmen Russo as model

References

External links
 

1979 films
1970s heist films
1970s sex comedy films
Italian heist films
Commedia sexy all'italiana
Films directed by Mariano Laurenti
Military humor in film
Films scored by Gianni Ferrio
1970s Italian-language films
1970s Italian films